Payne House may refer to:

in the United States (by state then city)
Payne House (Greensboro, Alabama), listed on the National Register of Historic Places (NRHP) in Hale County
Theodore F. Payne House, San Francisco, California, listed on the NRHP in San Francisco
Elisha Payne House, Canterbury, Connecticut, also known as Prudence Crandall House, a U.S. National Historic Landmark 
Daniel Payne House, Windsor, Connecticut, listed on the NRHP in Hartford County
A. A. Payne-John Christo, Sr., House, Panama City, Florida, listed on the NRHP in Bay County
Christy Payne Mansion, Sarasota, Florida, listed on the NRHP in Sarasota County
O. E. Payne House, Chariton, Iowa, listed on the NRHP in Lucas County
Payne House (Eubank, Kentucky), listed on the National Register of Historic Places in Pulaski County
Asa Payne House, Georgetown, Kentucky, listed on the NRHP in Scott County
Gen. John Payne House, Georgetown, Kentucky, listed on the NRHP in Scott County
Payne-Desha House, Georgetown, Kentucky, listed on the NRHP in Scott County
Henry Payne House, Lexington, Kentucky, listed on the NRHP in Fayette County
Lewis Payne House, Midway, Kentucky, listed on the NRHP in Woodford County
Payne House (Mount Eden, Kentucky), listed on the National Register of Historic Places in Shelby County
Monarch-Payne House, Owensboro, Kentucky, listed on the NRHP in Daviess County
Payne-Saunders House, Nicholasville, Kentucky, listed on the NRHP in Jessamine County
Payne-Gentry House, Bridgeton, Missouri, listed on the NRHP in St. Louis County
Robnett-Payne House, Fulton, Missouri, listed on the NRHP in Callaway County
Moses U. Payne House, Rocheport, Missouri, listed on the NRHP in Boone County
Payne Cobblestone House, Conesus, New York, listed on the NRHP in Livingston County
William Payne House, Greece, New York, listed on the NRHP in Monroe County
Col. Oliver Hazard Payne Estate, Esopus, New York, listed on the NRHP in Ulster County
Payne's Folly, Fawn Township, Pennsylvania, listed on the NRHP in York County 
Foster-Payne House, Pawtucket, Rhode Island, listed on the NRHP in Providence County
Charles Payne House, Pawtucket, Rhode Island, listed on the NRHP in Providence County
M. S. Payne House, Waxahachie, Texas, listed on the NRHP in Ellis County
Payne-Craig House, Janesville, Wisconsin, listed on the NRHP in Rock County

See also
Perry-Payne Building, Cleveland, Ohio, listed on the NRHP in Cuyahoga County
Payne Hotel, Saukville, Wisconsin, listed on the NRHP in Ozaukee County